Syeda Maimanat Mohsin (born 1959), commonly known as Jugnu Mohsin, is a Pakistani politician and journalist. She was an independent member of the Provincial Assembly of Punjab until 31 March 2022 and then joined PML(N) on 1 April 2022. Her term ended on 14 June 2023.

Previously, she has served as an editor of The Friday Times and Good Times. She previously hosted an eponymous weekly talkshow Jugnu.

Born into a wealthy Punjabi family, Mohsin studied law at University of Cambridge, where she met and married journalist Najam Sethi in 1983. In 1999, her husband, Friday Times editor-in-chief Najam Sethi, was arrested by the Nawaz Sharif government for his work as a journalist and held for a month without charge, causing Mohsin to launch an international campaign for his release. That year, she and Sethi were awarded the International Press Freedom Award of the Committee to Protect Journalists.

She won the 2018 Elections from PP 184 Constituency of Okara District by obtaining 62,506 votes.

Early life and education
She was born as Syeda Maimanat Mohsin to a landed gentry family.

She received her early education from the Convent of Jesus and Mary, Lahore and did her A-level from the Moreton Hall School.  She received her law degree from the University of Cambridge and was called to the Bar at Gray's Inn, London.

Journalism career
In 1984, Sethi was imprisoned on a charge of copyright but no Pakistani newspaper had protested the arrest. This led to Mohsin and Sethi wishing to commence their own independent newspaper. Sethi's name carried some infamy and so they applied for a publishing licence under Mohsin's name.

Called into Nawaz Sharif's office to discuss the application, Jugnu Mohsin told him that she intended to publish "a social chit chat thing, you know, with lots of pictures of parties and weddings". It was finally approved in 1987, but Mohsin requested a one-year delay to avoid the first issue coming out during the dictatorship of General Zia ul Haq. The paper's first issue appeared in May 1989.

1999 kidnapping incident
In early 1999, Sethi gave an interview to a journalist from the BBC television program, Correspondent. The program planned to expose corruption in the Pakistani government. At the beginning of May 1999, Sethi was warned that his arrest was imminent. On 8 May 1999, Sethi was taken from his home by government agents.

Mohsin said at least eight armed officers broke into their house; the family's security guards were assaulted; and no warrant was shown. Sethi was threatened and she was tied up and left locked in another room. Sethi was held for almost a month without charge. He was kept in the custody of the army intelligence group, Inter-Services Intelligence in Lahore.

Mohsin publicly campaigned for his release and continued to publish the Friday Times. Amnesty International stated that Sethi's arrest was connected with his investigations into government corruption, and designated him a prisoner of conscience. The US-based Committee to Protect Journalists sent a letter of protest letter to Prime Minister Nawaz Sharif, noting the organisation's dismay "that the state (Pakistan) continues its persecution of independent journalists". The World Bank president, James Wolfensohn called Sharif to urge for Sethi's release.

On 1 June 1999, the Pakistan government charged Sethi with "condemnation of the creation of the State and advocacy of the abolition of its sovereignty" and "promoting enmity between different groups". Sethi was transferred to the custody of the police. However, the following day, the Supreme Court of Pakistan ruled that the government had not provided sufficient evidence to justify Sethi's detention. Sethi was released, and the charges against him were dropped. Mohsin and Sethi received the International Press Freedom Award from the Committee to Protect Journalists.

My Feudal Lord book controversy
In June 1991, Mohsin and Sethi's publishing company, Vanguard Books, released Tehmina Durrani's  My Feudal Lord. The book relates her marriage with the politician and Punjab landlord, Mustafa Khar. In the book, Durrani alleges that Khar mistreated and abused her. Durrani signed a contract with Mohsin giving Mohsin foreign rights and fifty percent of foreign royalties.

On 19 May 1999, however, during Sethi's detention, Durrani said at a press conference that Sethi had stolen all of her earnings from the book. She said his actions were "an even bigger case of hypocrisy than my experience with the feudal system". Durrani sued Sethi for mental torture, and he counter sued for defamation. An earlier dispute over the foreign rights had been settled out of court in 1992. A review of the contracts by the UK newspaper The Independent described Sethi as having acted in good faith and described him and Mohsin as "the injured party".

Newspaper satire
During the rule of President Pervez Musharraf, Mohsin wrote a monthly humour column titled "Mush and Bush" featuring fictional conversations between the Pakistani President and US President George W. Bush. She had previously targeted Prime Minister Nawaz Sharif with a column for his "dim and authoritarian personality" and "his intolerance of dissent". Mohsin's sister, Moni Mohsin, satirises the country's social elites with another column for the paper, "Diary of a Social Butterfly".

Political views
Mohsin advocates for a liberal Pakistan and opposes religious fundamentalism. In January 2006, she argued for the right of women to participate in a marathon wearing shorts instead of the shalwar kameez. Mohsin is a member of the Women's Action Forum of Pakistan organization. She later became a major critic of Imran Khan's entry into politics. However, in 2018, after being elected as a member of the Provincial Assembly of the Punjab, she supported PTI. On 1 April 2022, she joined PML(N) prior to the no-confidence motion against Imran Khan.

Personal life
In 1983, she married a Punjabi Khatri businessman Najam Sethi whose family converted to Islam from Hinduism five generations ago. The couple has two children, Mira Sethi and Ali Sethi.

See also
List of Pakistani journalists

References

External links
 The Friday Times
 GoodTimes

1959 births
Living people
Pakistani lawyers
Pakistani women lawyers
Pakistani socialites
Pakistani women journalists
Pakistani women's rights activists
Pakistani newspaper founders
Pakistani newspaper publishers (people)
Punjab MPAs 2018–2023
Sethi family
Women newspaper editors
Convent of Jesus and Mary, Lahore alumni
Alumni of the University of Cambridge
People educated at Moreton Hall School
Members of Gray's Inn
Journalists from Lahore
Politicians from Lahore
Women members of the Provincial Assembly of the Punjab
21st-century Pakistani women politicians